Echemmaia is a town in Youssoufia Province, Marrakesh-Safi, Morocco. According to the 2014 census, it has 4,911 households and a population of 24,303.

References

Populated places in Youssoufia Province